Rostov is a Russian place name and a family name.

Urban settlements in the European part of Russia:

Rostov is a town in Yaroslavl Oblast, Russia; smaller, but very old (founded 862), in north-central section of the country's European part.
Rostov-on-Don is a larger and newer city, founded in 18 century, seat of the eponymous province Rostov Oblast, in the southwest of Russia.

Rostov may refer to:

Place name

in Yaroslavl Oblast
Rostov-Yaroslavski - a railway station in Rostov (Yaroslavl Oblast, Russia)
Rostov Urban Settlement - a municipal formation in Yaroslavl Oblast which the town of oblast significance of Rostov in Yaroslavl Oblast, Russia is incorporated as

Rostov Oblast
Rostov Oblast - a federal subject of Russia
Rostov-on-Don - a city in Rostov Oblast, Russia
FC Rostov - a Russian association football club from Rostov-on-Don, Russia
Rostov Arena - an association football stadium in Rostov-on-Don, Russia

Surname
Nikolay Rostov - a character in Leo Tolstoy's novel War and Peace
Petya Rostov - a character in Leo Tolstoy's novel War and Peace

See also
Rostovsky (disambiguation)
Rostow